The House of Commons Standing Committee on Public Accounts (PACP) is a standing committee of the House of Commons of Canada. It reviews the Auditor General's reports. It is one of five standing committees of the House that is chaired by a member of the opposition.

Mandate
Review and report on the Public Accounts of Canada
Examine all reports of the Auditor General of Canada

Membership

Subcommittees
Subcommittee on Agenda and Procedure (SPAC)

External links
 Standing Committee on Public Accounts (PACP)

References

Public accounts
Public Accounts Committees